Domaine Pinnacle Ice Cider is a Quebec ice cider introduced by Domaine Pinnacle in 2001, made from a blend of six different varieties of apples, selected from the company’s family-owned orchard on the southern slopes of Mount Pinnacle.

It has a declared alcohol content of 12% alcohol by volume.

Appearance and taste 

Domaine Pinnacle Ice Cider has a golden colour with orange highlights. The aroma is of fresh apples, cinnamon and spice, with a hint of honey.

It has been compared to other fine ice wines or Sauternes.
It pairs especially well with foie gras, goat cheese, blue cheeses and aged cheddar.

Storage and shelf life 
Ready to drink upon purchase, it can also be stored for many years and continues to improve with age. 
A sparkling version of Domaine Pinnacle’s original ice cider is also available. Upon release in 2004, it became the first of its kind available in the world.

Awards 
Critically acclaimed and award-winning, Domaine Pinnacle's ice cider has won more than 60 gold medals at prestigious international wine competitions and has come to be considered one of the world leaders in ice cider.

Most recently, it received acclaim when it was presented at the Taste of London 2013 food festival. 
It has also won many awards in recent years, including gold medals at the Prix de Public, the Coupe des nations and the Mondial des cidres de glace.

References 

Brands of cider
Cuisine of Quebec
Canadian alcoholic drinks